The Massacre of Glencoe Monument is a memorial to the Massacre of Glencoe (Scottish Gaelic: Mort Ghlinne Comhann), which took place in Glen Coe in the Highlands of Scotland on 13 February 1692, following the Jacobite uprising of 1689–92.

Sculpted by Alexander Macdonald and Co. of Aberdeen in 1883, a tapering 18-foot granite Celtic cross soars up from a rugged cairn above the river in Upper Carnoch.   Its design is based on the elaborate Gosforth Cross.  An annual wreath-laying ceremony is held at the Monument to commemorate those who fell in the massacre.

References

External links
 Donaldson, M.E.M., "MacDonald Monument, Glencoe Village", Am Baile: highland history and culture, ambaile.org.uk (retrieved 29 Oct 2019): monument photograph from first half of 20th century.

1883 establishments in Scotland
1883 sculptures
History of the Scottish Highlands
Monuments and memorials in Scotland
Jacobite rising of 1689
Granite sculptures in the United Kingdom
Sculptures in Scotland
Glen Coe
Celtic crosses
Category C listed buildings in Highland (council area)